Mar Menor Football Club is a Spanish football team based in San Javier, in the autonomous community of Murcia. Founded in 2007, it plays in Segunda División RFEF – Group 4, holding home games at Estadio Pitín, with a capacity of 3,000 seats.

History

Mar Menor Club de Fútbol was founded in 2007, after the disappearance of AD Mar Menor-San Javier.

In February 2017 the club changed its crest and its denomination to Mar Menor Football Club.

Season to season

1 season in Segunda División RFEF
10 seasons in Tercera División

References

External links

Football clubs in the Region of Murcia
Association football clubs established in 2007
2007 establishments in Spain